The Ontario Medal for Good Citizenship is a provincial medal of merit that is awarded in the Canadian province of Ontario.  It was established by the Government of Ontario in 1973 to recognize people who, through exceptional long-term efforts, have made outstanding contributions to the well-being of their communities and whose assistance is given without expectation of remuneration or reward.  Typically, eleven to thirteen medals are awarded each year.

Medal recipients are selected by an independent Advisory Council, which has the lieutenant governor of Ontario as its honorary chair. Recipients of the medal are entitled to use the post-nominal letters O.M.C.

Nominations for the medal may be made by any person or organization, but self-nominations will not be considered. Nominees for the medal must be residents of Ontario.

No elected federal, provincial, or municipal representative may be awarded the Ontario Medal for Good Citizenship while such person remains in office. The medal may not be awarded posthumously unless the Advisory Council had selected the recipient prior to their death.

Within the Canadian order of precedence for decorations and medals, the Ontario Medal for Good Citizenship is worn after the Queen's Medal for Champion Shot and before the Ontario Medal for Police Bravery.

See also
List of Canadian awards
List of Canadian provincial and territorial orders
Sovereign's Medal for Volunteers
Saskatchewan Volunteer Medal
British Columbia Medal of Good Citizenship

References

Provincial and territorial orders of Canada
Ontario awards